Jay R. Moyer (April 20, 1947 – February 28, 2018) was a Republican member of the Pennsylvania House of Representatives for the 70th legislative district. He was first elected in 2006 and was defeated in the 2008 election.

Moyer served as a township supervisor in Lower Salford Township until 1989, when he was appointed as acting treasurer of Montgomery County, Pennsylvania to fill the vacancy left when Floriana Bloss joined the County Board of Commissioners.  Moyer was re-elected to full terms in 1991 and 1995.

After leaving the treasurer's post in 2000, Moyer went on to serve under Governor Tom Ridge as the southeast regional director of the Pennsylvania Department of Revenue and deputy secretary of the Pennsylvania Department of Environmental Protection.  Prior to his election, Moyer was the regional representative for the deputy secretary of the United States Department of Education.

In 2006, Moyer ran for the House seat being vacated by retiring Rep. John Fichter.  He defeated Philip Heilman in the Republican primary election and won a close 103-vote victory in the general election over Democrat Netta Young Hughes.

He was defeated for re-election in the 2008 general election.

Moyer served in the United States Air Force from 1966 to 1970, achieving the rank of sergeant.  He went on to graduate from Syracuse University and attended graduate school at Temple University. Moyer was also a vice president of his family's business, Moyer Electric. He resided in Lower Salford Township with his wife.  They have one grown daughter, Christine, a reporter who lives in the Chicago area. Moyer died on February 28, 2018.

References

External links
Pennsylvania House of Representatives - Jay Moyer official PA House website
Pennsylvania House Republican Caucus - Representative Jay Moyer official Party website
Biography, voting record, and interest group ratings at Project Vote Smart

2018 deaths
Republican Party members of the Pennsylvania House of Representatives
Syracuse University alumni
People from Montgomery County, Pennsylvania
United States Air Force airmen
1947 births